The Mongolian gazelle (Procapra gutturosa), or dzeren, is a medium-sized antelope native to the semiarid Central Asian steppes of Mongolia, as well as some parts of Siberia and China. The name dzeren is Russian misinterpretation of the Mongolian language name of  zeer or Buryat zeeren (Buryat: Зээрэн).

Description
In the summer, its coat is light brown with pinkish tones, becoming longer and paler during the winter. It also has a distinctive heart-shaped white patch on its rump area, divided by a median line of darker color. The male has lyre-shaped horns which curl backwards from the forehead. It is an extremely fast runner and good swimmer.

In the winter, they are mostly diurnal, but in the summer, they are active shortly after sunrise and before sunset. They tend to travel a lot, and migrations takes place in spring and autumn, but the distance and direction vary depending on the weather and food availability.

Behaviour
The groups usually consists of 20-30 individuals in the summer, and 100 in the winter. However, herds up to 5,000 individuals are not unusual. They still exist in large numbers, with a small captive population; the population trend is unknown. In 2007, a mega-herd of a quarter of a million Mongolian gazelles was seen gathering on the country's steppes, one of the world's last great wildernesses.

Breeding
The mating season is in the late autumn or winter; at this time, the males' throats swell in a goiter-like effect. Competition is vigorous, but fights rarely break out. The gestation period lasts for about 5-6 months. Births occur is June and July, when groups of dozens of females separate from the herd to give birth, rejoining the herd afterward. They usually give birth to a single young and occasionally twins. They weigh about 3 kg and can keep up with their mother after a few days. They will be able to mate after 17-18 months.

Conservation
The Mongolian gazelle is still one of the most numerous large animals in the world, with the total population around 1.5 million individuals, but roughly 100,000 are killed each year. However, the conservation status is at least concern. Whether the population is increasing or decreasing is unknown, but the population is known to be subject to significant fluctuations due to diseases and severe winters.

References

External links
 Ultimateungulate.com

Mongolian gazelle
Mammals of Mongolia
Mongolian gazelle